Maritie (12 December  1922 – 23 November 2002) and Gilbert (20 March  1920 – 18 September  2000) Carpentier, a married couple, were artistic producers of very popular variety TV and radio shows in France and in many French-speaking countries, from the 1950s to the 1990s.

Biography

Family and studies 
Gilbert Carpentier, born in 1920, was the grandson of the French inventor Jules Carpentier (manufacturer, with the Lumière brothers, of the first cinematographe device) and the French acoustician Gustave Lyon. An alumnus of the Conservatoire de Paris music school, he was a pianist, organist and music composer.

Radio 
Just after World War II, Gilbert Carpentier started working at the French radio Radio-Luxembourg (which will later become RTL) as an organ player, then as a radio technician. From 1946, he started to compose musical illustrations, then, with the help of his wife Maritie who wrote the texts, started to produce radio soaps. From the 1950s, Maritie and Gilbert Carpentier directed six popular shows radio shows on Radio-Luxembourg: "L’heure musicale", "Le Club des Vedettes", (presented by Maurice Biraud), "Musique à la Clay" (presented by Philippe Clay), "Les contes de l’aigle", "L’heure exquise" (presented by Anne-Marie Carrière) and "Le miroir aux Etoiles", hosted every Sunday by a different artist.

Music 
In 1957, they created a series of Babar records for children. Maritie Carpentier adapted the writings from Jean de Brunhoff while Gilbert Carpentier composed the musics. Those records were awarded the Grand prix du disque prize in 1957 from the Académie Charles Cros, the French equivalent of the US Recording Academy.

TV 
Maritie and Gilbert Carpentier are mostly famous for being pioneers of variety TV shows in France. From 1960, after a proposal from the French main public TV channel ORTF, they started working for the TV. They first created numerous TV shows with their friends Roger Pierre and Jean-Marc Thibault, broadcast live on the ORTF. Later on, others artists joined, including Jean Poiret, Michel Serrault, Jacqueline Maillan or Jean-Claude Brialy.

In 1965, they asked Serge Gainsbourg to write a song to represent Luxembourg at the Eurovision Song Contest. Gainsbourg wrote Poupée de cire, poupée de son for the upcoming young French singer France Gall. The song won the contest and quickly became a world hit. 

Until the 1980s and especially in the 1970s, they created and directed several of variety TV shows in France, being influential in making some French artists very popular in French-speaking countries, such as Charles Aznavour, Gilbert Bécaud, Jane Birkin, Georges Brassens, Petula Clark, Dalida, Joe Dassin, Sacha Distel, Jacques Dutronc, Claude François, Serge Gainsbourg, France Gall, Chantal Goya, Johnny Hallyday, Serge Lama, Thierry Le Luron, Mireille Mathieu, Eddy Mitchell, Nana Mouskouri, Michel Sardou, Sheila, Alain Souchon, and Sylvie Vartan, among others.

Maritie and Gilbert Carpentier's TV shows are easy to recognize by their unexpected duets of artists, by the actors singing and singers acting, by the creation of different sceneries each week, or even by the scripting of their shows. Also, Maritie and Gilbert Carpentier's TV shows were often broadcast live and did not include artists' promotional content.
For most of them, since their beginnings in radio and until the 1980s, their shows were recorded in the mythic studio 17 of the Buttes-Chaumont Studios in Paris.

Some of their shows, the "Top à..." and "Numéro 1" series in particular, had an audience of 15 million viewers each week, and were being shown in 20 French-speaking countries.

Gilbert Carpentier was in charge of the technical part and the sceneries, while his wife Maritie Carpentier, sometimes nicknamed "la nounou des artistes" ("the artists' nanny"), was dealing with the artistic part.

In 1980, Maritie and Gilbert Carpentier won an Emmy Award for the best foreign TV show.

Detailed list of produced shows

Radio
 L’heure musicale, broadcast on Radio-Luxembourg
 Le Club des Vedettes, broadcast on Radio-Luxembourg and presented by Maurice Biraud
 Musique à la Clay, broadcast on Radio-Luxembourg and presented by Philippe Clay
 Les contes de l’aigle, broadcast on Radio-Luxembourg
 L’heure exquise, broadcast on Radio-Luxembourg and presented by Anne-Marie Carrière
 Le miroir aux Etoiles, broadcast on Radio-Luxembourg

TV
 Tréteaux dans la nuit (with Francis Blanche)
 La Grande Farandole (1961–1967)
 Teuf-Teuf (1963)
 Sacha show (1963–1971, presented by Sacha Distel)
 Les grands enfants (1967–1970)
 Jolie poupée (1968, with Sylvie Vartan)
 Les grands amis (1970, broadcast on ORTF 2nd channel)
 Deux sur la 2 (1970, with Roger Pierre and Jean-Marc Thibault, broadcast on ORTF 2nd channel)
 Devine qui est derrière la porte ? (1973, with Roger Pierre and Jean-Marc Thibault)
   (1973, cowritten by Maritie Carpentier, with Roger Pierre and Jean-Marc Thibault, parody of 1972's Les Rois maudits)
 Les Z'Heureux Rois Z'Henri (1974, cowritten by Maritie Carpentier, with Roger Pierre and Jean-Marc Thibault)
 Top à... (1972–1975, broadcast on ORTF 2nd channel)
 Dancing star (1977, with Jean-Claude Brialy, Marie-Paule Belle, Sylvie Vartan, Carlos, Gerard Lenorman, Michel Sardou)
 Numéro 1 (1975–1982, broadcast on TF1)
 Number One (1980, USA, with Catherine Deneuve, Sylvie Vartan, Mireille Mathieu, Dalida, Julien Clerc and Chantal Goya)
 La poupée de sucre (1983, co-written with Jean-Jacques Debout, with Chantal Goya)
 La semaine enchantée de Chantal Goya (1984, co-written with Jean-Jacques Debout, with Chantal Goya)
 Les dessous chics de Paris (1986, featuring Jane Birkin)
 Embarquement immédiat (1987–1988, broadcast on FR3)
 Elsa sous la neige (December 1989, featuring Elsa)
 Mes amis, mes amours (1997, a tribute to Charles Aznavour, with Charles Aznavour and Michel Serrault, broadcast on France 2)

Tributes
 Top à Maritie et Gilbert Carpentier, broadcast on TF1 on March 9, 1996, and presented by Christophe Dechavanne
 Nos meilleurs moments, broadcast on TF1 in August 2000
 Nuit du patrimoine spéciale Maritie et Gilbert Carpentier, broadcast on Paris Première on September 19, 2009
 Chabada special Carpentier broadcast on April 5, 2010, on France 3
 Quand la musique est bonne special Carpentier, broadcast on TMC on May 11, 2010
 Maritie et Gilbert Carpentier is also the name of a tribute song to the married couple from the French singer Bénabar

Bibliography
 La Maillan racontée par ses amis, Editions N°1, 1993
 Merci les artistes !, Anne Carrière, 1999

External links
  Maritie and Gilbert Carpentier archive by the French National Audiovisual Institute
  Gilbert Carpentier on IMDb (incomplete)
  Maritie Carpentier on IMDb (incomplete)

French television producers
Married couples
Knights of the Ordre national du Mérite